Reuben Samuel "Big" Parker, Jr. (July 18, 1893 – September 10, 1957) was an American college football player.

Sewanee
He was a prominent fullback and end for the Sewanee Tigers football team of Sewanee: The University of the South, chosen for the second-team all-time Sewanee football team. As a fullback he was touted as "'some' line plunger." Parker was from El Paso, Texas.

1913
Parker was selected All-Southern.

World War I
Parker was a veteran of World War I.

References

Players of American football from El Paso, Texas
American football ends
American football fullbacks
All-Southern college football players
Sewanee Tigers football players
1893 births
1957 deaths